Lace is the studio album by Canadian country music group Lace. The album was released on October 5, 1999 on 143 Records. The release led to the band receiving nominations for Group of the Year and Video of the Year (for "I Want a Man") at the 2000 Canadian Country Music Awards.

Track listing
 "I Want a Man" (Rick Giles, Tim Nichols, Gilles Godard) – 4:16
 "Life Is Good" (Deana Carter) – 3:59
 "Angel" (Sarah McLachlan) – 4:23
 "I Cry Real Tears" (Reed Vertelney, Linda Thompson-Jenner) – 4:25
 "Kiss 'Em All" (Bob Regan, Jeff Pennig) – 3:24
 "You Could've Had Me" (Stephanie Bentley, Eric Silver) – 3:46
 "Texas Ranger" (Gary O'Connor) – 3:17
 "He Can't Talk Without His Hand" (Giselle Brohman) – 4:55
 "So Gone" (Taylor Rhodes, Christopher Ward, Beth Hart) – 3:10
 "Swept Away" (John Scott Sherrill, Cathy Majeski) – 4:14
 "True Love (Never Goes Out of Style)" (Mark Dineen) – 3:49
 "If Not for Loving You" (Steve Diamond) – 3:49

Personnel

Lace
Corbi Dyann - vocals
Giselle - vocals
Beverley Mahood - vocals

Additional Musicians
Joe Chemay - bass guitar
Nathan East - bass guitar
Chris Farren - mandolin
Annalee Fery - background vocals
Pat Flynn - acoustic guitar
David Foster - keyboards
Larry Franklin - fiddle
Paul Franklin - steel guitar
John Hobbs - piano
David Hungate - bass guitar
Jeff King - electric guitar
Paul Leim - drums
Greg Morrow - drums
Dean Parks - electric guitar
Matt Rollings - piano
Brent Rowan - electric guitar
Biff Watson - acoustic guitar

Chart performance

References

Lace (band) albums
1999 debut albums
Albums produced by David Foster
Albums produced by Humberto Gatica
143 Records albums